The football tournament at the 2009 Southeast Asian Games was held in Vientiane, Laos. The men's tournament was played by under-23 national teams, while the women's tournament has no age limit.

Venues

Medal winners

Squads

Men's tournament

Participants 

 
 
 
 
 
 
 
 
 

All times are Indochina Time (UTC+7)

Group stage

Group A

Group B

Knockout stages

Semi-finals

Bronze-medal match

Gold-medal match

Winners

Goalscorers 
 6 goals
  Sompong Soleb
 5 goals
  Mai Tiến Thành
 4 goals
  Ahmad Fakri Saarani

 3 goals

  Lamnao Singto
  Baddrol Bakhtiar
  Mohd Safiq Rahim
  Norshahrul Idlan Talaha
  Hoàng Đình Tùng
  Phan Thanh Bình

 2 goals

  Keo Sokngon
  Kouch Sokumpheak
  Stevie Bonsapia
  Safuwan Baharudin
  Anawin Jujeen
  Apipoo Suntornpanavej
  Keerati Keawsombat
  Phạm Thành Lương

 1 goal

  Khim Borey
  Rendy Siregar
  Kanlaya Sysomvang
  Khampheng Sayavutthi
  Abdul Manaf Mamat
  Mohd Aidil Zafuan Abdul Radzak
  Mohd Amar Rohidan
  Mohd Amirul Hadi Zainal
  Mohd Nasriq Baharom
  Mohd Zaquan Adha Abdul Radzak
  S. Kunalan
  Kyaw Thiha
  Moe Win
  Pai Soe
  Soe Min Oo
  Tun Tun Win
  Fadhil Noh
  Fazli Ayob
  Hariss Harun
  Khairul Nizam
  Afiq Yunos
  Shaiful Esah
  Arthit Sunthornphit
  Piyachart Tamaphan
  Kriangkrai Pimrat
  João Kik
  Chu Ngọc Anh
  Nguyễn Ngọc Anh
  Nguyễn Trọng Hoàng
  Phan Thanh Hưng
  Trần Mạnh Dũng

 Own goal
  Mai Xuân Hợp (For Malaysia)
  Võ Hoàng Quảng (For Malaysia)

Final ranking

Women's tournament

Participants

Group stage

Final

Winners

Goalscorers 
 4 goals

  Souphavanh Phayvanh
  Pitsamai Sornsai
  Supaporn Gaewbaen
  Đoàn Thị Kim Chi

 3 goals

  Khin Marlar Tun
  Nguyễn Thị Muôn
  Trần Thị Kim Hồng

 2 goals

  Sochitta Phonhalath
  Moe Moe War
  My Nilar Htwe
  Naphat Seesraum
  Nisa Romyen
  Orathai Srimanee
  Sunisa Srangthaisong
  Sukunya Peangthem
  Nguyễn Thị Minh Nguyệt
  Văn Thị Thanh

 1 goals

  Khouanhta Sihanouvong
  Norhanisa Yasa
  Aye Nandar Hlang
  Khin Moe Wai
  Margret Marri
  Thu Zar Htwe
  Thanatta Chawong
  Kanjana Sungngoen
  Kwanruethai Kunupatham

 Own goal
  Nguyễn Thị Ngọc Anh (For Thailand)

Final ranking

References 

 
2009 Southeast Asian Games events
Football at the Southeast Asian Games
Southeast Asian Games
2009 in Asian football
2009